Rekordny was one of 29 s (officially known as Project 7) built for the Soviet Navy during the late 1930s. Completed in 1941, she was assigned to the Pacific Fleet.

Design and description
Having decided to build the large and expensive   destroyer leaders, the Soviet Navy sought Italian assistance in designing smaller and cheaper destroyers.

Their crew numbered 197 officers and sailors in peacetime and 236 in wartime. The designers had been conservative in rating the turbines and many, but not all, of the ships handily exceeded their designed speed during their sea trials. Others fell considerably short of it, although specific figures for most individual ships have not survived.

As built, the Gnevny-class ships mounted four  B-13 guns in two pairs of superfiring single mounts fore and aft of the superstructure. Anti-aircraft defense was provided by a pair of  34-K AA guns in single mounts and a pair of  21-K AA guns as well as two  DK or DShK machine guns. They carried six  torpedo tubes in two rotating triple mounts; each tube was provided with a reload. The ships could also carry a maximum of either 60 or 95 mines and 25 depth charges. The ships were equipped with two K-1 paravanes intended to destroy mines and a pair of depth-charge throwers.

Construction and service 
Major components for the ship that became Rekordny were laid down at Shipyard No. 198 (Andre Marti South) in Nikolayev on 25 September 1936 as yard number 327 and were then railed to Vladivostok for completion at Shipyard No. 202 (Dalzavod) where the ship was laid down again in July 1937. She was launched on 6 April 1939 and commissioned on 9 January 1941.

In Chinese service 
In 1955 Rekordny, was bought by the People's Liberation Army Navy (PLAN) and renamed Anshan. The ship was transferred to the People's Liberation Army Navy from the USSR in October 1954 along with three other former s of the Soviet Navy as part of a larger transfer deal which also saw the transfer of submarines, minesweepers and torpedo boats.

The ship was commissioned into the Chinese navy in 1955 and was named after the industrial city of Anshan in the modern province of Liaoning. She was assigned the pennant number 101. During the 38 years she served the PLAN, she was visited by nine foreign dignitaries as well as two Chinese leaders: Zhou Enlai and Deng Xiaoping

She was decommissioned in April 1992 and anchored at the Naval Museum at Qingdao.

References

Citations

Sources

Further reading 
 

Gnevny-class destroyers
1939 ships
Ships built at the Black Sea Shipyard
Museum ships in China